David Lane is a tram station on Nottingham Express Transit, in the city of Nottingham suburb of Basford. The tram lines here run parallel to the Robin Hood railway line that links Nottingham with Worksop, but there is no corresponding railway station. Both tram and railway lines have two tracks, and the resulting four tracks cross David Lane on a pair of parallel level crossings. The tram stop comprises a pair of side platforms on both sides of the tramway.

With the opening of NET's phase two, David Lane is now on the common section of the NET, where line 1, between Hucknall and Chilwell, and line 2, between Phoenix Park and Clifton, operate together. Trams on each line run at frequencies that vary between 4 and 8 trams per hour, depending on the day and time of day, combining to provide up to 16 trams per hour on the common section.

Nottingham Express Transit recommend using this stop to change between the Hucknall and Phoenix Park branches, rather than the next station (Highbury Vale) where the two branches diverge.

This is the closest tram stop to Basford United's football stadium, Greenwich Avenue.

Gallery

References

External links

Nottingham Express Transit stops